This is a list of notable schools in Egypt.

Cairo
 Malvern College Egypt
 As-Salam College
 American International School in Egypt
 Abbas El-Akkad Experimental Language School
 British International College of Cairo
 British International School in Cairo
 Cairo American College
 Cairo English School
 Collège de la Sainte-Famille
 Collège-des-Frères (Bab-El-Louk)
 Collège du Sacré-Coeur
 Dar El Tarbiah School
 Deutsche Evangelische Oberschule
 Deutsche Schule der Borromäerinnen Kairo
 El Zahrat Language School
 Lycée Français du Caire
 Lycée Al Horreya Héliopolis
 Malvern College Egypt
 Manarat Al-Qahira Language School
 Manarat Al-Mostaqbal Language School
 Manarat Al-Mostaqbal American School
 Misr American College
 Modern Education Schools 
 Manor House School, Cairo 
 New Cairo British International School
 New Generation Schools
 Orouba Language School
 Port Said American School
 Port Said International Schools
 Ramses College
 Royal Academy Language School (Sakkara Road / Marrioteya)
 Saint Fatima School
 Saint George's College

Giza
 Cairo Japanese School
 Deutsche Evangelische Oberschule

6th of October City and Sheikh Zayed City
 British International School in Cairo
 Green Land Pré Vert International School

Alexandria
Deutsche Schule der Borromäerinnen Alexandria
Schutz American School
 Egyptian English Language School
 Collège Saint Marc, Alexandria
 Victoria College, Alexandria
 Salahaldin International School

Hurghada
 Ecole Française d'Hurghada
Deutsche Schule Hurghada

Kafr El-Zayat 

 Kafr El-Zayat Secondary School For Boys

Manqabad 
 Manqabad Secondary School

See also

 Education in Egypt
 List of universities in Egypt
 Lists of schools

Schools
Schools
Schools
Egypt
Egypt
Egypt